The Autopista Tepic–San Blas is a toll highway in the Mexican state of Nayarit. The  road was constructed and is operated by Red de Carreteras de Occidente, which charge cars 49 pesos (on weekdays) or 69 pesos (on weekends) to travel the full length of the road.

History
RCO was the only bidder for the toll road, winning on April 22, 2016, though construction of the road had begun in October 2009. The road was inaugurated by President Enrique Peña Nieto on February 21, 2017, together with the Libramiento de Tepic.

References

External links 
Shield Reference

Mexican Federal Highways